The Little Nokasippi River is a  tributary of the Nokasippi River in southern Crow Wing County, Minnesota.

See also
List of rivers of Minnesota

References

Minnesota Watersheds
USGS Hydrologic Unit Map - State of Minnesota (1974)

Rivers of Minnesota
Tributaries of the Mississippi River
Rivers of Crow Wing County, Minnesota